Hallgarten is a surname. Notable people with the surname include:
 Charles Hallgarten (1838–1908), German-American banker, philanthropist and social reformer
 George W. F. Hallgarten (1901–1975), German-American historian